Meili Xin Shijie may refer to:

A Beautiful New World, a 1999 Chinese film directed by Shi Runjiu
Genesis (S.H.E album), a 2002 Mandopop album by the girl group S.H.E